Rudolf Prich (6 August 1881 – 1940) was a Polish military officer and a major general (pol. generał dywizji) of the Polish Army. He was among the Polish officers who were murdered by the Soviet Union during the Katyń massacre.

Life
Prich was born in 1881 in Opava, Austrian Silesia. During his youth, he joined the Austro-Hungarian Army, where he served with distinction during the Great War. In April 1919, he returned to Poland and joined the Polish Army. During the opening stages of the Polish-Bolshevik War between December 1919 and April 1920, he served as the head of the 1st Detachment of the General Staff, responsible for organization and mobilization of forces. Between April 1920 and 1922 in the Polish ministry of military affairs, after the Peace of Riga he remained in the army.

In 1923, after a year of service at the post of commanding officer of the 26th Infantry Division, he was promoted to the rank of generał brygady. After the May Coup d'État of 1926, he was sent to the Centre for Artillery Training in Toruń, where he served as one of the professors and a specialist in anti-air artillery. Promoted to the rank of generał dywizji in 1928, he retired from active service in 1935.

The 1939 invasion of Poland
After the outbreak of the Polish Defensive War, he returned to duty and on 11 September, was made the commander of all the Polish forces defending the area of Lwów. He held that post until relieved on 16 September, and then took part in the battle of Lwów as a commander of one of the areas of defence of the besieged city. After the capitulation of the Polish forces had been negotiated on 22 September 1939, Prich was to be released home along with other reserve and retired officers, which was a lie.

Katyn
Contrary to the terms of the capitulation he was arrested by the NKVD and held in various prisons in the city. He was murdered in the spring of 1940, aged fifty-eight, during the Katyń massacre. Among the Katyn victims were 14 Polish generals including Leon Billewicz, Bronisław Bohatyrewicz, Xawery Czernicki (admiral), Stanisław Haller, Aleksander Kowalewski, Henryk Minkiewicz, Kazimierz Orlik-Łukoski, Konstanty Plisowski, Alojzy Wir-Konas, Franciszek Sikorski, Leonard Skierski, Piotr Skuratowicz, and Mieczysław Smorawiński.

References

Bibliography 

 Piotr Stawecki, Słownik biograficzny generałów Wojska Polskiego 1918-1939, Warszawa 1994, s. 261, 

1881 births
1940 deaths
People from Opava
People from Austrian Silesia
Polish generals
Austro-Hungarian military personnel of World War I
Polish people of the Polish–Soviet War
People of the Polish May Coup (pro-government side)
Polish military personnel killed in World War II
Polish deportees to Soviet Union
Katyn massacre victims
Executed Czech people